Róchez is a surname. Notable people with the surname include:
 Austin Rochez, rapper under the name 645AR
 Bryan Róchez (born 1995), Honduran footballer
 Harrison Róchez (born 1995), Belizean footballer
 Jairo Róchez (born 1991), Honduran footballer
 Tomás Róchez (born 1964), retired Honduran footballer